Leonidas Johnson Rountree (July 15, 1868 - May 2, 1923) was an American politician. He was born in Dripping Springs, Texas on July 15, 1868. His grandfather was Samuel Johnson. He married Francis Mitchell. He became a member of Texas House of Representatives from 1921 to 1923. He died of a stroke on May 2, 1923, after giving a speech in the Texas House of Representatives, in the Texas State Capitol in Austin, Texas. He was buried in Bryan City Cemetery in Bryan, Texas.

References

1886 births
1923 deaths
Members of the Texas House of Representatives
20th-century American politicians
People from Dripping Springs, Texas